Tamluk subdivision is a subdivision of the Purba Medinipur district in the state of West Bengal, India. It under Burdwan division.

Subdivisions
Purba Medinipur district is divided into the following administrative subdivisions:

Administrative units

Tamluk subdivision has 6 police stations, 7 community development blocks, 7 panchayat samitis, 82 gram panchayats, 852 mouzas, 805 (+ 1 partly) inhabited villages, 2 municipalities and 11 census towns. The municipalities are: Tamluk and Panskura. The census towns are: Anantapur, Dakshin Baguan, Kakdihi, Shantipur, Kolaghat, Amalhara, Mihitikri, Kharisha, Goasafat, Kotbar and Erashal. The subdivision has its headquarters at Tamluk.

Area
Tamluk subdivision has an area of 1084.30 km2, population in 2011 of 1,791,695 and density of population of 1,652 per km2. 35.16% of the population of the district resides in this subdivision.

Police stations
Police stations in Tamluk subdivision have the following features and jurisdiction:

*The data for area is as per the website of Purba Medinipur Police, but it appears that it has not been updated for a long time.

Blocks
Community development blocks in Tamluk subdivision are:

Gram panchayats
The subdivision contains 82 gram panchayats under 7 community development blocks:

 Nandakumar block: Byabattarhat Paschim, Bargodagodar, Kalyanpur, Seoraberia Jalpai–I, Basudevpur, Kumarara, Seoraberia Jalpai–II, Byabattarhat Purba, Chakshimulia, Kumarchak, Shitalpur Paschim and Dakshin Narikelda.
 Moyna block: Bakcha, Mayna–I, Naichanpur–II, Srikantha, Mayna–II, Paramanandapur, Tilkhoja, Gozina, Naichanpir–I and Ramchak.
 Tamluk block: Anantapur–I, Bishnubarh–II, Padumpur–II, Sreerampur–I, Anantapur–II, Nilkunthia, Pipulberia–I, Sreerampur–II, Bishnubarh–I, Padumpur–I, Pipulberia–II, Uttar Sonamui.
 Sahid Matangini block: Balluk–I, Kakharda, Raghunathpur–I, Shantipur–II, Balluk–II[kakatiya bazar], Kharui–I, Raghunathpur–II, Dhalhara, Kharui–II and Shantipur–I.
 Panskura block: Chaitanyapur–I, Haur, Panskura–I, Radhaballavchak, Chaitanyapur–II, Keshapat, Pratappur–I, Raghunathbari, Ghoshpur, Khandakhola, Pratappur–II, Gobindanagar, Mysora and Purusottampur.
 Kolaghat block: Amalhanda, Deriachak, Kola–II, Sidhha–II, Baishnabchak, Gopalnagar, Pulshita, Bhogpur, Khanyadihi, Sagarbarh, Brindabanchak, Kola–I and Siddha–I.
 Chandipur block: Brajalalchak, Chaukhali, Jalpai, Osmanpur, Brindabanpur–I, Dibakarpur, Kulbari, Brindabanpur–II, Iswarpur and Nandapur Baraghuni.

Education
With a literacy rate of 87.66% Purba Medinipur district ranked first amongst all districts of West Bengal in literacy as per the provisional figures of the census of India 2011. Within Purba Medinipur district, Tamluk subdivision had a literacy rate of 85.98%, Haldia subdivision 86.67%, Egra subdivision 86.18% and Contai subdivision 89.19%. All CD Blocks and municipalities in the district had literacy levels above 80%.

Given in the table below (data in numbers) is a comprehensive picture of the education scenario in Purba Medinipur district for the year 2013-14.

Note: Primary schools include junior basic schools; middle schools, high schools and higher secondary schools include madrasahs; technical schools include junior technical schools, junior government polytechnics, industrial technical institutes, industrial training centres, nursing training institutes etc.; technical and professional colleges include engineering colleges, polytechnics, medical colleges, para-medical institutes, management colleges, teachers training and nursing training colleges, law colleges, art colleges, music colleges etc. Special and non-formal education centres include sishu siksha kendras, madhyamik siksha kendras, centres of Rabindra mukta vidyalaya, recognised Sanskrit tols, institutions for the blind and other handicapped persons, Anganwadi centres, reformatory schools etc.

The following institutions are located in Tamluk subdivision:
Tamralipta Mahavidyalaya was established at Tamluk in 1948. It is affiliated with Vidyasagar University. It offers courses in arts, science, commerce and education.
College of Engineering and Management, Kolaghat, was established in 1998, in the township of Kolaghat Thermal Power Station. It is affiliated with Maulana Abul Kalam Azad University of Technology.
Rabindra Bharati Mahavidyalaya was established at Kolaghat in 2010. It is affiliated with Vidyasagar University.
Panskura Banamali College was established at Panskura in 1960. It is affiliated with Vidyasagar University. It offers undergraduate and post graduate courses.
Moyna College was established 1972 at Moyna. It is affiliated with Vidyasagar University.
Maharaja Nandakumar Mahavidyalaya was established at Bhabanipur in 2007. It is affiliated with Vidyasagar University.
Siddhinath Mahavidyalaya, a government degree college, was established at Shyamsundarpur Patna in 2013.
 Tamralipta Institute of Management & Technology was established at Tamluk in 2007. It is affiliated to Maulana Abdul Kalam Azad University of Technology.
 Shahid Matangini Hazra Government College for Women was established in 2015 at Chak Srikrishnapur, PO Kulberia.

Healthcare
The table below (all data in numbers) presents an overview of the medical facilities available and patients treated in the hospitals, health centres and sub-centres in 2014 in Purba Medinipur district.  
 

Medical facilities available in Tamluk subdivision are as follows:

Hospitals: (Name, location, beds) 
District Hospital, Tamluk, 300 beds
Baroma Sirona Hospital, Dakshin Mechogram, PO Uttar Mechogram, Psychiatry clinic
Rural Hospitals: (Name, CD block, location, beds)
Uttar Mechogram Rural Hospital, Panskura CD block, Uttar Mechogram, PO Keshapat, 30 beds
Paikpari Rural Hospital, Kolaghat CD block, PO Kolaghat Notun Bazar, 30 beds
Anantapur Rural Hospital, Tamluk CD block, Anantapur, PO Chanserpur, 30 beds
H.S. Janubasan Rural Hospital, Sahid Matangini CD block, Janu Basan, PO Nonakuri Bazar, 30 beds
Erashal Rural Hospital, Chandipur CD block, Erashal, PO Math Chandipur, 30 beds
Khejurberia Rural Hospital, Nandakumar CD Block, PO Nandakumar, 30 beds
Block Primary Health Centre: (Name, block, location, beds)
Gar Moyna BPHC, Moyna CD Block, PO Moyna, 15 beds
Primary Health Centres: (CD block-wise)(CD block, PHC location, beds)
Panskura CD block: Purba Itarah, PO Raghunathbari (6), Patanda (10)
Kolaghat CD block: Machinan, PO Rain Gopalnagar (6), Nandaigajan, PO Bhogpur (10)
Tamluk CD block: Kelomal (10), Purbanakha, PO Putputia (10)
Sahid Matangini CD block: Ramchandrapur (10), Uttar Dhalhara, PO Dhalhara (2)
Chandipur CD block: Gokhuri, PO Majnaberia (2), Baraghuni (10)
Nandakumar CD block: Dakshin Damodarpur (10), Dakshin Gumai, PO Kalyanchak (2)
Moyna CD block: Ramchandrapur (2), Arangkianara (10)

Electoral constituencies
Lok Sabha (parliamentary) and Vidhan Sabha (state assembly) constituencies in Purba Medinipur district were as follows:

External links

References

Subdivisions of West Bengal
Subdivisions in Purba Medinipur district
Purba Medinipur district